The Metropolitan Transportation Authority (MTA) operates a number of bus routes in Staten Island, New York, United States. Some of them are the direct descendants of streetcar lines (see list of streetcar lines in Staten Island). Many routes run to the St. George Terminal, at St. George in northeastern Staten Island, where there are connections to the Staten Island Ferry. The fare, payable by MetroCard, coins, or the OMNY contactless payment system, is $2.75 as of 2021. Discount fares are available.

Routes
This table gives details for the routes prefixed with "S" - in other words, those considered to run primarily in Staten Island by the MTA. For details on routes with other prefixes, see the following articles:

List of express bus routes in New York City: 

Routes marked with an asterisk (*) run 24 hours a day. Connections to New York City Subway stations, the Staten Island Ferry, or Hudson–Bergen Light Rail at the bus routes' terminals are also listed where applicable.

Local Service

S79 Select Bus Service 
Operated as a Select Bus Service (SBS) route with specially-wrapped buses, the S79 provides limited-stop service at all times except overnights. Formerly a local route, the S79 was converted to an SBS route in 2012, with the number of stops cut by about three-quarters.  But unlike the SBS buses in the rest of New York City, S79 fares are collected on board the bus, not at machines at the bus stops.

Limited-Stop Service
All limited-stop services, except for the S89 and S93, duplicate the routes of their respective local services. The S93 runs weekdays from 6:00am to 10:00pm. Other routes run weekday rush hours only.

Bus route history 
Except for the S61, all current Staten Island bus routes originally had different designations before they were renumbered by service patterns, as follows:

S4x: North Shore services
S5x: North-south cross-island services
S6x: Victory Boulevard services
S7x: South Shore services
S8x & S9x: Limited-stop versions of their respective local routes ending in the same number. (Ex: S62/S92, S48/S98). S8x routes provide north-south limited stop service while S9x routes provide east-west limited stop service. The S81, S84, and S86 are limited-stop versions of the S51, S74, and S76 respectively, while the S91, S94, and S96 are limited-stop versions of the S61, S44, and S46 respectively.

On April 2, 1989, routes on the North Shore of Staten Island were renumbered.

The implementation of this numbering scheme was completed on April 15, 1990, when the final eight routes, all from St. George, were renumbered.

Old and new routes are given below, along with discontinued service patterns. In addition, before 1975, routes were designated with R (for Richmond, the borough's official name before 1975) instead of S. The R designation is shown in the "Old Route" section.

References
MTA NYC Transit - Bus Service

External links

Staten Island
Transportation in Staten Island

Staten Island
Staten Island-related lists